Gillen was an electoral division of the Legislative Assembly in Australia's Northern Territory. It existed between 1974 and 1983, and was named after Francis James Gillen, an Australian anthropologist.

Members for Gillen

Election results

Elections in the 1970s

Elections in the 1980s

References

Former electoral divisions of the Northern Territory